Typhoon Maria, known in the Philippines as Typhoon Gardo, was a powerful tropical cyclone that affected Guam, the Ryukyu Islands, Taiwan, and East China in early July 2018. Developing into the eighth named tropical storm of the 2018 Pacific typhoon season and passing the Mariana Islands on July 4, Maria strengthened into the fourth typhoon of the season and underwent rapid intensification the next day amid favorable environmental conditions. Over the next three days, it started to gradually weaken due to another eyewall replacement cycle and decreasing sea surface temperatures. After crossing the Yaeyama Islands and passing north of Taiwan on July 10, Maria ultimately made landfall over Fujian, China, early on July 11, before dissipating the next day.

Early in its lifetime, Maria brought winds of tropical storm force to Guam, damaging aircraft at Anderson Air Force Base and knocking out power across the island. Damage in Guam was valued at US$150,000. On July 10, Maria brought strong winds to Okinawa Prefecture, inflicting significant crop damage. Losses in the prefecture reached JP¥853.7 million (US$ million). Simultaneously, Maria produced heavy rains and strong winds across Taiwan, killing one and injuring eight. Power to nearly 60,000 households was cut and agricultural damage was around NT$1.3 million (US$). From landfall to dissipation, Maria impacted the Chinese provinces of Fujian, Zhejiang, Jiangxi, and Hunan with flooding rain and gusty winds. At least 510,000 people in coastal regions evacuated and one person was killed in Jiangxi. Schools and workplaces were closed in parts of Fujian and more than 200 flights were cancelled. Train and ferry services were also disrupted. Power outages were widespread in Fujian, where more than 320,000 customers lost power. Economic losses across China were about CN¥4.16 billion (US$ million).

Meteorological history

The broad system tracked northwest around a region of high atmospheric pressure to its north as it began to consolidate, with the United States-based Joint Typhoon Warning Center (JTWC) determining that the system had become a tropical depression at 12:00 UTC. Twelve hours later, the JMA stated that the depression had become a tropical storm and named the system Maria. On July 5, Maria began to rapidly intensify as it developed an eye feature. Immediately after, Maria began to undergo an eyewall replacement cycle, with microwave satellite imagery revealing that a new eyewall had developed and encircled the original eyewall.

Some weakening took place on July 7 as Maria went through the eyewall replacement cycle, with the JTWC assessing that Maria had dropped below super typhoon strength. A developing high-pressure area to Maria's northwest caused the system's forward motion to decrease while the inner eyewall dissipated and the outer eyewall began to contract. However, Maria did not immediately restrengthen as upper-level wind patterns temporarily became unfavorable. More substantial reintensification occurred on July 8 as Maria began to accelerate northwest once again and the system regained super typhoon strength at 00:00 UTC.

Late on July 9, Maria developed concentric eyewalls once again, indicating another eyewall replacement cycle was underway. Combined with decreasing upper oceanic heat content along the cyclone's path, Maria began to weaken steadily as it turned to the west-northwest. At 21:00 UTC on July 9, Maria entered the Philippine Area of Responsibility and received the local name Gardo. As the system passed north of Taiwan on July 10, frictional effects with the island's mountains as well as increasing northerly wind shear further weakened the cyclone. Rapid weakening took place once Maria moved inland, with the storm degrading to a tropical depression by 18:00 UTC. The remnant system continued inland and dissipated over Hubei before 00:00 UTC on July 13.

Preparations and impact

Guam
Maria damaged a number of KC-135 aircraft in Andersen Air Force Base when passing near Guam as a tropical storm on July 5. The air base recorded an unusually high wind gust of  associated with the passage of a mesoscale convective vortex and an embedded hot tower—features that often support rapid intensification of tropical cyclones. Several flights to and from the island were cancelled. An islandwide power outage occurred on July 5 after gusty winds downed power lines, and the local weather radar was knocked out. Damage on the island was estimated at US$150,000.

Ryukyu Islands
As a weakening typhoon, Maria made a direct hit on Miyakojima, Okinawa Prefecture, on July 10. On that day, schools in Miyakojima were closed, while flights to and from Miyako Airport and New Ishigaki Airport were cancelled. Ferry services connecting Miyakojima and Ishigaki Island with the surrounding islands were suspended for ten days. The sugarcane crop suffered severe wind damage, with some fields in Miyakojima reporting that up to 70 percent of their crops had been damaged. Total damage in Okinawa Prefecture was about JP¥853.7 million (US$ million), of which nine-tenths came from the sugarcane crop. Other crops affected included pineapple, mango, millet, and okra. Damage to infrastructure was limited, reaching JP¥6.75 million (US$) in Kumejima.

Taiwan
As Maria passed north of Taiwan, heavy rain and gusty winds impacted the island. Workplaces and schools were closed on July 10 and resumed operations on July 11. Services along the Taiwan High Speed Rail were interrupted by the adverse weather conditions. The Forestry Bureau closed 14 national forest recreational areas from July 10 to 12. A man in New Taipei City sustained fatal head injuries after losing his balance when inspecting his house. Seven men and a woman were injured in northern Taiwan by falling branches. Strong winds caused 59,485 households to lose power, though the situation was mostly resolved by July 11. Agricultural damage in Taiwan was valued at NT$1.3 million (US$). The typhoon also eroded away part of Huaping Islet, causing its shape to now resemble a two-humped camel instead of a one-humped camel.

East China

Ahead of Typhoon Maria, authorities initiated evacuations in coastal parts of Fujian and Zhejiang provinces. By July 11, at least 226,600 people were evacuated in Fujian, while in Zhejiang, about 390,000 people were moved to safety, including 270,000 people from Wenzhou. In both provinces, fishing boats were ordered to return to port; the Port of Xiamen received 851 vessels, while 25,000 boats sought shelter in Zhejiang. Offshore fish farms in Fujian were closed and over 27,600 workers returned to shore. Ferry services between Xiamen and Kinmen were suspended. At least 200 train services in and out of Fujian were halted, while 206 flights to and from Zhejiang were cancelled. Across Fujian, 7,865 schools were closed and works at 4,439 construction sites were stopped. In Fuzhou, the provincial capital of Fujian, all schools and factories were closed on July 11. In Jiangxi province, authorities evacuated over 1,100 people, closed 21 tourist attractions, and suspended passenger transport services to Fujian and Zhejiang.

Upon landfall in Lianjiang County on July 11, Typhoon Maria became the strongest July typhoon to make landfall in Fujian. Maria brought heavy rains and gusty winds to Fujian, Zhejiang, Jiangxi, and Hunan, affecting 1.424 million people and causing direct economic losses of CN¥4.16 billion (US$ million). About 800 people in Zhejiang were rescued by emergency services, and 200 houses were damaged to varying degrees. In Fujian, 8,800 houses were damaged and another 300 were destroyed. Widespread power outages occurred in Fujian: over 86,000 customers in Lianjiang County and another 240,000 customers in Fuzhou lost power. Knee-deep flooding occurred in some residential areas in Fuzhou, where the police deployed 1,623 personnel to assist in flood control efforts. Fujian's water infrastructure suffered CN¥76 million (US$ million) worth of damage. Authorities deployed 11,000 personnel across the province to conduct repairs. In Ningde, direct economic losses reached CN¥959 million (US$ million). At least 40 houses in the city collapsed and 184 businesses were shut. Around 2,000 trees in Ningde were damaged by strong winds. In Ji'an, Jiangxi, the typhoon affected more than 24,200 people, damaged  of cropland, and caused CN¥13.61 million (US$ million) in losses. A person in Ji'an County was killed by a tree that was felled by the typhoon's winds.

See also

Other storms named Maria
Other storms named Gardo
Weather of 2018
Tropical cyclones in 2018
Typhoon Sinlaku (2002) – passed north of Taiwan and made landfall in Zhejiang in September
Typhoon Saomai (2006) – most powerful typhoon on record to impact East China
Typhoon Soulik (2013) – July system that hit northern Taiwan and Fujian
Typhoon Nesat (2017) – another July system that hit Taiwan and Fujian

Notes

References

External links

JMA General Information of Typhoon Maria (1808) from Digital Typhoon
JMA Best Track Data of Typhoon Maria (1808)
10W.MARIA from the U.S. Naval Research Laboratory

2018 Pacific typhoon season
July 2018 events in Asia
Typhoons in Japan
Typhoons in Taiwan
Typhoons in China
Maria